Taking the Head of Goliath is a Christian death metal band that originated in 2015.

Background
Taking the Head of Goliath started in 2015 with members Jake Martin, Matt Vangsgard and Nathan Sherman. The band later added rhythm guitarist Rob Blake. The band became best known when they hired bassist/backing vocalist Luke Renno of the band Crimson Thorn. The band played their first show at one of For Today's final tour dates. The band has recently signed to Rottweiler Records.

The band was featured on a compilation called Kill the Ill, a Benefit Compilation for Shawn Browning, owner and founder of Rottweiler. The band is currently working on a new album. Vangsgard departed from the band on October 1, 2017. The band would later announce that Steve Reishus, former Crimson Thorn drummer, had joined the band as their drummer. Over the weekend of January 25-27th, the band set out on the Hasten Revelation tour, as a four-piece, alongside A Hill to Die Upon, Death Requisite, and Abated Mass of Flesh, with supporting acts in each city including Light Unseen, The Weeping Gate, Ecclesiast, Halcyon Way, and Broken Flesh. On February 10, 2019, the band announced the departure of Blake, continuing as a four piece. Later that year, it was announced that the band would be embarking on the second annual Hasten Revelation alongside Abated Mass of Flesh, Broken Flesh, Cardiac Rupture, and Crimson Thorn on March 7-14, 2020. On September 11, 2019, it was announced that the band had a new single coming soon, titled “Cord Of Three Strands”, which would debut on October 4, 2019. The track was leaked a few days before release, but officially released on October 4, 2019. On November 15, 2019, the band would play a show with Terrorizer, Nile, Glutton For Punishment, and Coffinrot. My Place Was Taken joined the Hasten Revelation tour, replacing Broken Flesh in the lineup. On August 30, 2020, the band announced that they added on second guitarist and another Crimson Thorn member, Miles Sunde, to the lineup, with the band currently working on their debut album, Futility of the Flesh.

Name
The band explained the name of the band in an interview with The Metal Resource.

Members
Final Lineup
 Jake Martin - vocals (2015-2023) (Devitalize, Broken Flesh)
 Nathan Sherman - guitar (2015-2023) (S.B.I.)
 Miles Sunde - guitars (2020-2023) (Crimson Thorn, ex-Axehead Inc., Obadiah)
 Luke Renno - bass, backing vocals (2016-2023) (Crimson Thorn, ex-Axehead Inc., Obadiah, ex-Altruist, ex-Temple of Perdition)
 Steve Reishus - drums (2017-2023) (Crimson Thorn, ex-Temple of Perdition)

Former
 Matt Vangsgard - drums (2015-2017) (ex-Fistbate)
 Rob Blake - guitar (2016-2019)

Timeline

Discography
Studio Albums
 Futility of the Flesh (2020)

Live Albums
 Beyond Brutal Live (2017)

EPs
 Taking the Head of Goliath (2018)

Singles
 “Cord of Three Strands“ (2019)

References

Rottweiler Records artists
Musical groups established in 2015
Death metal musical groups
American Christian metal musical groups
2015 establishments in Minnesota